The Mask of Loki (1990) is an epic science fantasy novel by American writers Roger Zelazny and Thomas T. Thomas, detailing a centuries long struggle between the avatars of Loki and Ahriman.

External links
http://www.isfdb.org/cgi-bin/title.cgi?7993

American fantasy novels
American science fiction novels
1990 American novels
Novels by Thomas T. Thomas
Novels by Roger Zelazny
Collaborative novels